Ignacio Mendy (born 29 June 2000) is an Argentine rugby union player who plays for the Benetton. He made his debut appearance at the Olympics representing Argentina at the 2020 Summer Olympics. His playing position is fullback.

Career 
He represented Argentina at the 2018 Summer Youth Olympics and was part of the Argentine team which whereas Argentina defeated France 24-14 in the final to claim the gold medal in the boys rugby sevens tournament. He was also named in Argentine senior rugby sevens squad for the 2018–19 World Rugby Sevens Series. On 28 December 2018, Mendy was named in the Jaguares squad for the 2019 Super Rugby season.

He was also selected to Argentina squad to compete at the 2020 Summer Olympics in the men's rugby sevens tournament. He was also subsequently part of the Argentine side which claimed bronze medal after defeating Great Britain 17-12 in the third place match at the 2020 Summer Olympics. It was also the first ever Olympic medal for Argentina in rugby sevens. 

In August 2021 Mendy was named in Argentina squad for 2021 Rugby Championship. He made his debut on 21 August in 2021 Rugby Championship against South Africa.

In 2022 he played for the Jaguares XV in Superliga Americana de Rugby.

References

External links
 

Jaguares (Super Rugby) players
Rugby union fullbacks
Argentine rugby union players
2000 births
Living people
Rugby union players from Buenos Aires
Rugby sevens players at the 2018 Summer Youth Olympics
Youth Olympic gold medalists for Argentina
Rugby sevens players at the 2020 Summer Olympics
Olympic rugby sevens players of Argentina
Olympic bronze medalists for Argentina
Olympic medalists in rugby sevens
Medalists at the 2020 Summer Olympics
Benetton Rugby players